Austin Franklin Pike (October 16, 1819October 8, 1886) was a United States representative and Senator from New Hampshire. Born in Hebron, New Hampshire, he pursued an academic course, studied law, and was admitted to the bar of Merrimack County in 1845. He was a member of the New Hampshire House of Representatives from 1850 to 1852 and in 1865–1866, and served as speaker during the last two years. He was a member of the New Hampshire Senate in 1857–1858, serving as president the last year.

Pike was elected as a Republican to the Forty-third Congress (March 4, 1873 – March 3, 1875) and was an unsuccessful candidate for reelection in 1874 to the Forty-fourth Congress. He was elected as a Republican to the U.S. Senate after a lengthy deadlocked election in the New Hampshire Legislature and served from August 2, 1883, until his death. While in the Senate, he was chairman of the Committee on Claims (Forty-eighth and Forty-ninth Congresses). He died in Franklin, New Hampshire; interment was in Franklin Cemetery.

Personal life
Pike married twice; he married his second wife, Caroline White, in 1850 and had three children with her - Helen, Edward E., and Leila. His daughter Helen married Frank Nesmith Parsons, Pike's law partner from 1879 until his death; Parsons was later Chief Justice of the New Hampshire Supreme Court (1902–1924).

See also
List of United States Congress members who died in office (1790–1899)

References

 
 

1819 births
1886 deaths
Republican Party members of the New Hampshire House of Representatives
Republican Party New Hampshire state senators
Republican Party United States senators from New Hampshire
Speakers of the New Hampshire House of Representatives
Republican Party members of the United States House of Representatives from New Hampshire
19th-century American politicians
People from Hebron, New Hampshire